Alberta Provincial Highway No. 39, commonly referred to as Highway 39, is an east–west highway in central Alberta, Canada.

Highway 39 also connects with the communities of Breton, Warburg, Thorsby, and Calmar; while most of the small communities are now bypassed, Highway 39 still travels along Main Street in Calmar.

History
Highway 39 was originally constructed as a link between Leduc and Breton, where it ended at Highway 12 (now Highway 20). In 1955, a ferry across the North Saskatchewan River started operations southeast of Drayton Valley, resulting in Highway 57 following present-day Highway 616 to Breton. It proved to be short-lived as in 1957, the Highway 57 was realigned across a new bridge, terminating with Highway 39 in Alsike. In the 1960s, a  section of Highway 39 between Breton and Alsike was renumbered to Highway 12, resulting in Highways 12, 39, and 57 once again terminating at a common point, this time in Alsike. In 1980, the Highway 22 designation was extended north, which included a  section of Highway 57 being renumbered; the remaining  section of Highway 57 became part of Highway 39.

Major intersections 
From west to east:

References 

039
Leduc, Alberta